The St. Kitts-Nevis Observer is a newspaper serving St. Kitts and Nevis. The publication has a St. Kitts office in Basseterre and a Nevis office. The Observer Began Publishing October 1994.

References

External links 

Newspapers published in Saint Kitts and Nevis
Saint Kitts